Governor Rutledge may refer to:

Edward Rutledge (1749–1800), 39th Governor of South Carolina
John Rutledge (1739–1800), 31st Governor of South Carolina